Lei Uk or Lei Uk Tsuen is the name or part of the name of several villages in Hong Kong:

 Lei Uk Tsuen (North District) in Ta Kwu Ling, North District
 Lei Uk Tsuen (Sha Tin District) in Tai Wai, Sha Tin District
 Lei Uk Tsuen or Lee Uk Tsuen in Ha Tsuen, Yuen Long District